Unshinagh Mountain is a townland of 635 acres in County Antrim, Northern Ireland. It is situated in the civil parish of Tickmacrevan and the historic barony of Glenarm Lower.

See also 
List of townlands in County Antrim
List of places in County Antrim

References

Townlands of County Antrim
Civil parish of Tickmacrevan